Malacca UMNO Museum is a museum which exhibits historical matters about the founding and struggle of United Malays National Organisation (UMNO) in Malacca City, Malacca, Malaysia. It opens every day from 9.00 a.m. to 5.30 p.m., except Friday in which it closes from 12.45 p.m. until 2.45 p.m.

See also
 List of museums in Malaysia
 List of tourist attractions in Malacca

References

Buildings and structures in Malacca City
Museums in Malacca
United Malays National Organisation